Steven Klein is an American film, television, and theater actor and producer. He is the founder of Firefly Theater & Films, a Los Angeles-based production company. The company has staged a number of productions, including works by Itamar Moses, Jane Martin, and Geraldine Hughes. Through Firefly, Klein has also produced several films including Finders Keepers, Print the Legend, and Wrestle. As an actor, he has appeared in various stage, film, and television roles including in An Infinite Ache, The Circle, and Burn Notice.
 
Early life and education
 
Steven Klein was born in Boston and grew up in Brookline, Massachusetts. He attended Yale University, where he founded and ran the Yale Undergraduate Shakespeare Company. He acted in a number of productions at Yale including The Tempest, which was directed by fellow Yale alumnus and future business partner, Matt Shakman. Klein also received training at Kristin Linklater's Shakespeare & Company in Massachusetts. He graduated from Yale in 1998, with a BA in Theater.

Career
 
Klein founded Firefly Theater in 1996. Matt Shakman also played a role in the foundation of Firefly, which operated as a theatre collective staging experimental projects in its early days. Klein's first major Los Angeles stage appearance came in a March 2000 production of Mark Ravenhill's Shopping and Fucking at the Celebration Theatre. In August 2000, Klein's Firefly Theater company staged a production of Shakespeare's Measure for Measure at the Black Dahlia Theatre, a Los Angeles playhouse and companion theatre company set up by Shakman and Klein. Klein would go on to serve as staff producer and occasional actor at the Black Dahlia in the following years. One of the early works he produced and acted in at the Black Dahlia was Austin Pendleton's Orson's Shadow in April 2001.
 
Also in 2001, Klein co-created with producer Bruce Cohen a short film collective called Catme with film producer, Bruce Cohen. In 2003, Klein was a producer on Geraldine Hughes' one-woman show, Belfast Blues, which premiered at the Black Dahlia Theatre in February of that year. The show went on to stage several other productions including at the Off Broadway Barrow Street Theatre in New York and the Off West End Soho Theatre in London. Klein also had his first television guest role in 2003 on an episode of Star Trek: Enterprise.
 
In January 2004, he acted in a production of Neil Simon's Biloxi Blues at the Walnut Street Theatre in Philadelphia. In September 2004, Klein produced and starred in David Schulner's An Infinite Ache alongside Suzy Nakamura at the Black Dahlia Theatre. He later returned to Philadelphia's Walnut Street Theatre to reprise his role in a separate production of the play in 2007. He continued producing and acting in several Firefly co-productions, including Jane Martin's Flags (2007) at the Black Dahlia Theatre and Itamar Moses' The Four of Us (2008) at the Elephant Theatre Lab. The former play was transferred to the Off Broadway 59E59 Theater later in 2007.
 
In 2010, Klein appeared on an episode of Burn Notice. Also that year, his Firefly Theater outfit expanded into film production, and its name was changed to Firefly Theater & Films. Firefly's first film was a 2011 documentary feature about aspiring teenage magicians called Make Believe, which won the documentary award at the LA Film Festival. In 2011, Klein co-created (with Jordana Malick) the annual Unscreened event in which screenwriters, directors, and actors would stage a series of short plays using scripts that were often initially intended for film or television. The series ran until 2015 and featured actors like Lindsey Kraft, Jerrika Hinton, Tig Notaro, Nate Corddry, Maria Thayer, and Klein himself in plays penned by writers like James Ponsoldt, Aisha Muharrar, and Dahvi Waller.
 
In 2014, Klein was a producer on the 3D printing documentary Print the Legend, which premiered on Netflix in September of that year. The following year, he served as executive producer on another documentary, Finders Keepers. Through Firefly, he has also produced several other films, including Kensho at the Bedfellow  (2017), Out of Omaha (2018), and Wrestle (which was distributed by Oscilloscope and premiered on PBS' Independent Lens in 2019). In 2017, he produced and acted in a production of Lin Bo's Caught at an art gallery in Los Angeles. The event, which was described as both an art installation and a theater piece, was a co-production between Firefly, VS. Theater Company, and Think Tank Gallery. In 2020, Klein co-created, produced, and starred in a television pilot for a comedy series called Everyone Together''. It went on to win the award for best comedy pilot at SeriesFest that year.

Credits

Film and television

Theater

References

External links
Firefly Theater & Films

Year of birth missing (living people)
Living people
Male actors from Boston